Tales from the Crib is the first studio album by the North Vancouver punk band d.b.s. It was released by Nefer Records in 1995.

Track listing 
 "Sorsha" – 1:48
 "Won't Forget" – 1:43
 "Freedom" – 3:09
 "Racist School" – 3:00
 "Snowball" – 2:04
 "March" – 3:35
 "School Sux" – 1:15
 "Directions" – 2:34
 "Sing" – 1:52
 "I'm Blind" – 1:35
 "Real Man" – 0:14
 "The Difference" – 1:35
 "Oh My God" – 1:33
 "The Canada Song" – 0:52
 "Y.A.S." – 0:46
 "It's All Right" – 1:18
 "30 Seconds" – 0:38
 "Jay" – 3:33
 "Solitaire" – 2:35
 "Too Involved" – 2:33
 "Chubbles (1)" – 0:05
 "Chubbles (2)" – 0:11
 "Chubbles (3)" – 0:08

The last three tracks, all entitled "Chubbles", consist only of laughter.

Personnel 
 Andy Dixon – guitar, backing vocals
 Jesse Gander – vocals
 Paul Patko – drums, backing vocals
 Dhani Borges – bass guitar

References 

D.b.s. albums
1995 debut albums